The Westleigh School (formerly Westleigh High School) is a co-educational secondary school located in Leigh in the English county of Greater Manchester.

It was first established by Lancashire County Council and became a comprehensive school in 1976. Later the school also gained a specialism in technology. Previously a community school administered by Wigan Metropolitan Borough Council, in August 2018 Westleigh High School converted to academy status and was renamed The Westleigh School. The school is now sponsored by the Shaw Education Trust.

The Westleigh School offers GCSEs, BTECs and the CiDA as programmes of study for pupils.

References

External links
Westleigh High School official website

Secondary schools in the Metropolitan Borough of Wigan
Academies in the Metropolitan Borough of Wigan
Shaw Education Trust
Educational institutions established in 1976
1976 establishments in England